Robert Guza Jr. (born 1951 ) is an American television writer and producer, who formerly held the position as head writer on the ABC Daytime soap opera General Hospital.

Personal life
Guza has been married to actress and fellow writer Meg Bennett since the late 1980s.

Career
During the 2007 WGA strike, Garin Wolf assumed head writing duties through March 17, 2008, at which time Guza's post-strike episodes hit the air waves.

Positions on General Hospital
Script Writer (hired by Anne Howard Bailey; 1982–1987)

Head writer
March 1996 – September 1996: with Karen Harris
December 1997 – December 2000: Solo
June 13, 2002 – March 10, 2006: with Charles Pratt Jr. (re-hired by Angela Shapiro)
March 13, 2006 – January 2007: Solo
February 2007 – October 2007: with Meg Bennett
October 2007 – January 3, 2008; March 17, 2008 – July 25, 2011

Other writing positions
General Hospital: Night Shift; July 12, 2007 – October 4, 2007
Head writer (with Elizabeth Korte)

Loving
Head writer (with Millee Taggart): 1992

Melrose Place
Script Writer: 1992 (hired by Darren Star)

Models Inc.
Script Writer and Story Editor: 1994

Port Charles
Storyline Consultant: 1998

Santa Barbara
Breakdown Writer: 1988–1991

Sunset Beach
Co-Creator (with Charles Pratt Jr. & Josh Griffith) and head writer: January 1997 – October 1997

Prom Night
co-written with William Gray

Curtains 

Melanie

Awards and nominations
Guza has been nominated for twenty Daytime Emmy Awards, the first being in 1994. Guza has won three Daytime Emmys for his work as head writer (all for General Hospital), four Emmys for his role as a consulting producer in GH's wins for Outstanding Drama Series, and one as a breakdown writer for Santa Barbara's win of Outstanding Writing Team. Guza was nominated six times for a Writers Guild of America Award (winning once), and has been nominated for a Genie Award.

Writing history

See also
List of General Hospital crew

External links
 ABC Daytime: GH
EntertainmentWeekly

SoapCentral
NewYorkTimes

SoapOperaDigest: The Write Stuff (Interview)
Serial Writing

References

American soap opera writers
American male television writers
Soap opera producers
Place of birth missing (living people)
American television producers
1951 births
Living people
Best Screenplay Genie and Canadian Screen Award winners